Creative visualization is a term used by New Age, popular psychology, and self-help authors and teachers in two contexts.

Firstly, it is used by some to denote the practice of generating positive and pleasant visual mental imagery with intent to recover from physical sickness or disability and eliminate  psychological pain.
Secondly, it is used by others to signify the generation of autobiographical visual mental imagery, by which the participant envisions themselves in desired circumstances, commonly evoking prospective images that depict abundance of financial wealth, professional or vocational success and achievement, pervasive health, and persistent happiness.

Background

Creative visualization and New Age popularity

The use of the term 'Creative Visualization' to denote the practice of visualizing idealized autobiographical mental imagery indicative of physical, psychological, social, and financial goals has remained one of many self-realization or self-actualization pursuits characteristic of popular psychology and the New Age since the personal development author Shakti Gawain published a book entitled Creative Visualization in 1978.

The first line of the book reads "Creative Visualization is the technique of creating what you want in your life". The following opening paragraphs define imagination as the "creative energy of the universe", and introduces the book as a means by which to use the so-defined imagination to "create what you truly want — love, fulfillment, enjoyment, satisfying relationships, rewarding work, self-expression, health, beauty, prosperity, inner peace, and harmony."

Nineteenth century origins in New Thought

Gawain's book popularized a premise derived from the New Thought movement that began during the nineteenth century, primarily in the United States and the United Kingdom. The premise is that individuals have a mind containing mental content, including thoughts, images, memories, and predictions, which become manifested through the experience of living.

Claims and hypotheses
According to advocates of New Thought, physical sickness and mental illness, as well as unfortunate circumstances, are the consequence of such mental content. Furthermore, they allege that when an individual controls, modifies, and regulates their mind and mental content, then material life and the experience of living alters accordingly, healing physical sickness, disability and psychological pain, and transforming destitution, indenture, and misery into wealth, autonomy, and happiness.

Gawain's book focuses primarily on making changes to visual mental imagery, and attributes to it the capacity for hindering or facilitating an individual's potential, citing vivid anecdotal stories drawn from her experience and that of others to support her thesis.

Subsequent to the popularity of the book, the practice of creative visualization, as described by Gawain, remained a staple and stable feature within the New Age movement, self-help media, and popular psychology of the 1980s, 1990s, and first decade of the 21st century.

Universal energy in eastern cultures

The belief in a universal life force or energy was and remains common to diverse ancient traditions, where it is variously named Qi or Ch'i in Chinese culture, (Traditional Chinese: 氣), (Simplified Chinese: 气), and Prana (Sanskrit: प्राण) in Indian Hindu-based philosophies, religion, and cosmologies, and thereby was not an original concept formulated by Gawain.

Creative visualization and universal energy in the 21st century

The claim that thoughts and visual mental images are composed of a universal energy described by Gawain in 1978 as the "creative energy of the universe", which can be brought under volitional control by Creative Visualization was amplified and exaggerated twenty-eight years later by the author and television producer, Rhonda Byrne.

In 2006, Byrne made a film called The Secret, and compiled a subsequent book of the same name, which made significant claims for the potential human use of such an energy, and popularized a maxim called the Law of Attraction, originally proposed in 1906 by New Thought author William Walker Atkinson, in his book Thought Vibration or the Law of Attraction in the Thought World.

Byrne's book and film The Secret, and its rendition of the Law of Attraction, asserted three claims. Firstly, that thoughts and other mental content, such as visual imagery, is composed of "pure energy". Secondly, that this is the same energy that permeates everyone, everything, and brings order to the universe. Thirdly, that this energy obeys the principle of 'like attracts like', such that if you think negative thoughts, or visualize unpleasant or undesirable images, the energy of which those thoughts and images are allegedly made will attract the material manifestation of what you think and visualize.

According to advocates of this maxim, including Bob Proctor, Neale Donald Walsch, and Jack Canfield, it is also logically reversible, such that negative or undesirable circumstances are to be interpreted as the causal outcome of negative thoughts and images.

Criticism
Byrne's inspiration for The Secret 
 came from a book entitled The Science of Getting Rich, by writer Wallace D. Wattles, originally published in 1910. The assertions made in The Secret film and book have been widely criticized, sometimes scathingly, by a number of commentators, for implying that undesirable circumstances and conditions, such as poverty, physical pain and psychological pain, result exclusively from a failure to exercise control over the mind by successfully harnessing and directing a hypothetical universal energy, a concept upon which many New Age principles and practices rely.<ref
name=HuffEhren>
</ref>

The concept of positive thinking has far-reaching implications in many arenas making it a dangerous ideology to promote. By simply thinking positively, people can “cure” themselves of physical diseases, such as cancer, and will often refuse medical intervention on such grounds. After The Secret aired on Oprah Winfrey, for example, a woman by the name of Kim Tinkham wrote a letter to Oprah telling her that she would be using positive mental imagery to fight against her breast-cancer diagnosis. In order to believe in the power of positive thinking to cure oneself of illness or improve one's life circumstances requires that we sacrifice rational thought as it goes against everything we know about the way the world works. The cost of promoting the positive thinking movement results in lives lost as people begin to refuse medical treatments in favour of “curing” themselves. 
There are other costs as well. For example, businesses that refuse to acknowledge any problems with their business strategies because it is seen as being too pessimistic. The person who does point out the flaws in business strategies is labelled as being all doom-and-gloom and an inadequate team player. In politics, it is also problematic because many campaigns and policy changes are promoted through the politicians’ sheer belief that a given policy or platform will be effective, rather than on the soundness of the policy itself.
The problems the positive thinking movement has brought upon the education system absolutely must be addressed. The influence of the positive thinking movement can be seen in the move towards an education system that values boosting self-esteem over educational accomplishment.  The idea was that boosting self-esteem would lead to high academic achievement, but all that has happened is that we focus exclusively on boosting self-esteem to the detriment of education attainment. Teachers cannot fail children so they are being passed through every grade regardless of their performance or how much knowledge they have demonstrated, and can pass in assignments whenever it so pleases them.  Such an educational system, which has been influenced by the positive thinking movement, is detrimental to society as a whole because it produces entitled kids who have no sense of responsibility, hard work, or accountability and likely will not be the kind of citizens who will contribute in a meaningful way to society. Furthermore, such children will find it difficult to succeed in a work environment where qualities such as responsibility, hard work, and accountability are still highly valued.

References

New Age
New Age practices